The Black Scorpion is a 1957 black-and-white Mexican-American giant arachnid horror film from Warner Bros., produced by Jack Dietz and Frank Melford, directed by Edward Ludwig, and starring Richard Denning, Mara Corday, Carlos Rivas, and Mario Navarro.

The film's stop-motion animation special effects were created by Willis O'Brien.

Plot

An earthquake strikes Mexico, resulting in the overnight birth of a new volcano. Geologists Dr. Hank Scott and Dr. Arturo Ramos are dispatched to study this crisis at the village of San Lorenzo, the two men finding a destroyed house and a totaled police car en route. They find a dead policeman nearby, and an abandoned and seemingly orphaned infant. They take the infant to San Lorenzo and give it to friends of the child's missing parents, while being welcomed by the village's priest, Father Delgado. Delgado reveals that the property damage is caused by something that is slaughtering the livestock, the villagers believing the culprit to be a demon bull and have been pestering Delgado for divine assistance.

Undaunted, Hank and Arturo begin their geological survey as members of the Mexican army under Major Cosio arrive in San Lorenzo to begin disaster-relief efforts. Hank meets and falls in love with local rancher Teresa Alvarez, and makes friends with a young boy named Juanito. When the volcano erupts again, the culprits behind the disappearances and deaths are revealed as giant prehistoric scorpions. After killing a crew of telephone repairmen, the scorpions attack San Lorenzo with the Mexican military unable to harm them. The next morning, the scorpions have returned to their underground lair (which is also home to giant worms and spiders), leaving the authorities to seek the help of renowned entomologist Dr. Velasco. Velasco enlists Hank and Arturo to figure out means of destroying the scorpions or seal off the entrance to the cavern.

Despite collapsing the cave entrance, the giant scorpions took refuge in the caves before resurfacing days later to attack a train. Some of the passengers are killed as in-fighting among the scorpions resolves with the largest of them killing the others before heading for Mexico City. Hank and Arturo come up with a plan to lure it to a stadium with a truckload of meat, with the military distracting it long enough for Hank to kill it by shooting an electric cable attached to a spear into its throat, which is its only vulnerable spot. After destroying several tanks and helicopters, the surviving fighters detonate the electric charge, finally slaying the last scorpion.

Cast
 Richard Denning as Dr. Hank Scott
 Mara Corday as Teresa Alvarez
 Carlos Rivas as Dr. Arturo Ramos
 Mario Navarro as Juanito
 Carlos Múzquiz as Dr. Velasco
 Pascual García Peña as Dr. Delacruz
 Pedro Galván as Father Delgado
 Arturo Martínez as Major Cosio
 Fanny Schiller as Florentina

Production
Willis O'Brien, creator of the stop-motion animation effects for the original King Kong, was the special-effects supervisor, albeit on a smaller budget. Pete Peterson, who worked with O'Brien on Mighty Joe Young and would again on The Giant Behemoth, did most of the actual hands-on animation. O'Brien borrowed heavily from his previous films for the stop-motion special effects. The miniatures used for the trapdoor spider and the giant tentacled worm have been reported to be the same ones that were used in the now "Lost Spider Pit Sequence" from the original King Kong (1933). The trapdoor spider model matches precisely the smaller spider model seen in behind-the-scenes stills from King Kong. Biographers, however, dispute whether O'Brien saved his models, and Ray Harryhausen's An Animated Life noted that many models used in King Kong were still in storage at RKO in the 1950s, by which time many were decayed. The sounds made by the giant scorpions were reminiscent of the giant ant sound effects used in Them! A large-scale scorpion "head" was used for close-up reaction shots.

Reception
Harrison's Reports gave The Black Scorpion a mixed review, with praise for its special effects but reservations about its unexceptional storytelling, long running time, and mediocre photography with revolting closeups.  The New York Times liked the Mexican locations and some of the "technical fakery" but considered the film "strictly standard" with forgettable human plot elements.

Mystery Science Theater 3000
The Black Scorpion was featured in episode number 113 of Mystery Science Theater 3000. The episode debuted February 3, 1990, on the Comedy Channel. In show continuity, this was the last episode for Josh Weinstein, who voiced robot Tom Servo and portrayed Dr. Clayton Forrester's assistant, Dr. Laurence "Larry" Erhardt. Dr. Erhardt was proclaimed missing and replaced by Frank Conniff's TV's Frank in season two, while Kevin Murphy began voicing Tom Servo. However, although the episode number suggests this was the last episode of MST3K'''s first season, Women of the Prehistoric Planet (episode  104) was produced and aired after The Black Scorpion, so that movie was actually the last in which Weinstein participated.Paste writer Jim Vogel did not rate the episode highly. "It's a little tedious, sure, but the film actually sports some pretty damn cool-looking stop-motion animation special effects," Vogel wrote, but "the story ... is instantly forgettable." The episode did not make the Top 100 list of episodes as voted upon by MST3K Season 11 Kickstarter backers.

The MST3K version of The Black Scorpion was included as part of the Mystery Science Theater 3000, Volume XXX DVD collection, released by Shout! Factory on July 29, 2014. The other episodes in the four-disc set include Outlaw, The Projected Man, and It Lives by Night. The Black Scorpion disc included the featurette Stinger of Death: Making the Black Scorpion.

Home media
The film was released on region 1 DVD with a cardboard snapper case in an open matte 4:3 ratio. This version was replaced by a 1.78:1 widescreen print, both on region 1  DVD and a region free Blu-ray, released by Warner Bros. Archive Collection.

The extras on all releases include stop-motion test footage by Pete Peterson for unrealized projects, animated around the late 1950s, known as “Las Vegas Monster” and “Beetlemen”, and the sequence that Harryhausen and O’Brien animated for the 1956 Irwin Allen documentary, The Animal World.

References

Further reading
 Warren, Bill. Keep Watching the Skies: American Science Fiction Films of the Fifties'', 21st Century Edition. Jefferson, North Carolina: McFarland & Company, 2009 (First Edition: volume one, 1982, volume two, 1986). .

External links

 
 
 
 
 

1957 horror films
1950s science fiction horror films
1950s monster movies
1957 films
Giant monster films
Warner Bros. films
American monster movies
Films directed by Edward Ludwig
Films using stop-motion animation
Films set in Mexico
Films set in Mexico City
Films with screenplays by David Duncan (writer)
Films about arthropods
Films scored by Paul Sawtell
1950s English-language films
1950s American films